The Clermont Carn transmission site is situated at the summit of Clermont Carn in County Louth and was opened in 1981 to provide UHF television coverage for the northeast of the Republic of Ireland, counties Louth, Meath, and North County Dublin.

Initially the two channels RTÉ One and RTÉ2 were carried on Ch52 and Ch56 with TV3 on Ch66 and TG4 on Ch68 following later. FM radio transmission was also added providing coverage of the five national channels to its service area, and in 1982, a 2M Amateur Radio Repeater was installed.  
In 2002, a new  cable-stayed mast was erected and this greatly improved coverage into Northern Ireland. The original self-supporting tower was truncated, and is now only used for microwave links and the Amateur Radio Repeater.

Digital terrestrial television (DTT) trials started in 2008, and in common with all 2RN transmitters in Ireland, analogue television transmissions from this site ended on 24 October 2012. Uniquely, Clermont Carn is the only main television transmitter in Ireland that is vertically polarised, and does not service any relay transmitters. Today the Irish digital television service Saorview is broadcast from here to a sizeable area including a large tract of Northern Ireland, with a good signal being received in Belfast and beyond. This overspill has been welcomed by the UK's Ofcom who have provided information for viewers in Northern Ireland about receiving the RTÉ channels and TG4 both from within Northern Ireland on the UK's Freeview service, and via the Saorview overspill.

Digital television

FM radio

Amateur radio

Gallery

References 
 Content moved from Clermont Carn; see that page's history for attribution

Transmitter sites in Ireland